Thein Win Zaw (born 2 February 1963) is a Burmese businessman, best known for founding Shwe Byain Phyu Group of Companies, a conglomerate with business interests in petrol stations, jade mining, timber, and food exports. He was also the chairman of Gems and Jewelry Entrepreneurs Association (Yangon) from 2018 to 2020.

Early life and career
Thein Win Zaw was born on 2 February 1963, hailing from Twante Township in Yangon Region, Myanmar. He graduated in 1984 with a Bachelor of Science degree in chemistry.

Business interests

Thein Win Zaw founded Shwe Byain Phyu Group (SBP) in 1996, and operates a business partnership with the military-owned Myanma Economic Holdings Limited for mining, fuel imports and distribution. Thein Win Zaw's business success has been attributed to his close relationship with the Myanmar Navy's senior leadership, including the navy's commanders-in-chief Tin Aung San and Soe Thane.

Telecommunications 
Thein Zaw has previously as a director in Mahar Yoma Public Company, which has a partial stake in Mytel, the military-owned telecommunications company. In February 2022, news emerged that Shwe Byain Phyu would own 80% of Telenor Myanmar with Lebanese M1 Group owning the remaining shares, as Norwegian-based Telenor sought to divest in its Myanmar operations following the 2021 Myanmar coup d'état. Shwe Byain Phyu and M1 Group have formed a joint venture, Investcom, to take over Telenor operations in Myanmar. The planned sale has prompted significant scrutiny from Burmese civil society over data privacy concerns, given SBP's links to the Burmese military. Sanctions screening through external consultants stated that Shwe Byain Phyu and its owners are not subject to any current international sanctions.

Personal life

Thein Win Zaw is married to Tin Latt Min, and has two children, Win Paing Kyaw, and Theint Win Htet.

References

Living people
1963 births
Burmese businesspeople